This article summarizes the outcomes of all official matches played by the Lebanon national football team by opponent and by period, since they first played in official competitions in 1940.

Results in chronological order

The summarizing tables below show Lebanon's official matches per period. More extensive reports (with dates, scores, goal scorers and match circumstances) can be found on the main articles per period.

1940–1989

Results list Lebanon's goal tally first.

1990–1999

Results list Lebanon's goal tally first.

2000–2009

Results list Lebanon's goal tally first.

2010–2019

Results list Lebanon's goal tally first.

2020–present

Results list Lebanon's goal tally first.

See also
 Lebanon women's national football team results
 List of Lebanon national football team managers
 Lebanon national football team records and statistics

References